The Ghana DJ Awards are an annual award ceremony for DJs in Ghana. They were created with the aim to recognize and honour DJs, and individuals who have influenced electronic dance music in Ghana, as well as to foster the development of the Ghana music industry by rewarding and celebrating radio, mobile and club DJs who have excelled in their fields of endeavor.

History
Founded in 2011, the event aims to highlight contribution Ghana DJs have made to the music distribution & promotion by playing on radio, endorsing and putting songs out to be enjoyed by the masses. In 2012, the very first edition of the Ghana DJ Awards was conceived by Merqury Quaye and was held at the National Theatre on 15 February 2012.

Notable musicians who have dominated the main stage at Ghana DJ Awards include Medikal, DJ Mic Smith, DJ Que, Kuami Eugene, KiDi, Darkovibes, Stonebwoy, DJ Vyrusky, MzVee, Kwaw Kese, DJ Kofi, DJ Black and DJ Jimmy Jatt.

Awards
As of the 2015 Ghana DJ Awards, in 2015, there are a total of thirty-four categories awarded.

In September 2020, the organizers introduced an all new category "Lockdown DJ of the Year" to award DJs who entertained music fans during the COVID-19 lockdown period.

Categories
The top awards are presented in eight categories which include, Best DJ of the Year, Best International Non-Ghanaian DJ, Best International Ghanaian DJ, Discovery of the year, Best Event DJ of the Year, Artiste DJ of the Year, Best Mobile DJ of the Year and Best Mixtape DJ of the Year. Other categories include, DJ/Artist Collaboration of the Year, DJ's Song of The Year, Scratch DJ of The Year, Best Video Jockey of The Year, Best Club MC of The Year, Best Night Club DJ of The Year, Best Female Radio DJ of The Year, Best Male Radio DJ of The Year and Best Female DJ of The Year.

During the 2018, Mark Okraku-Mantey was awarded Ghana DJ Awards Lifetime Achievement Award at the 2018 Ghana DJ Awards for his service and contribution to the DJ profession in Ghana.

Eligibility and entry
As per the committee guidelines, All other categories are through nomination by a jury of industry professionals. Entries are made online, once a work is entered, reviewing sessions are held, involving the advisory board, to determine whether the work is entered in the correct category, using their expert knowledge and prior artist acknowledgements and achievements so that they can be judged on merit.

In September 2020, Ghana DJ Awards unveiled its newly appointed 12-member board of directors. The new board announced that DJs below 18 years of age would no longer be nominated in the Overall Best DJ of the Year category but instead, they would compete for the Young DJ of the Year award. Thirteen year old DJ Switch who won Best DJ of the Year in 2019, was the first recipient of the newly created award.

Changes

Venue
In October 2019, organizers of the event announced a new venue for the event. the event from the originally announced venue the National Theatre to the Accra International Conference Centre.

Controversies
In February 2012, there was growing controversy about the Ghana DJ Awards, a few weeks after the event was announced. The awards festival sparked speculations of rivalry and arguments between some known DJs in Accra.

In May 2012, Ghanaian DJs residing abroad have lamented about the unfairness on the part of organizers for allocating only one category for Ghanaian international DJs in the first ever honorary program for Ghanaian DJs. Organizers of the Awards later expressed their appreciation of the genuine concerns raised by the international DJs and explained that the suggestions and concerns would be reviewed and addressed accordingly in subsequent editions.

In October 2019, DJ Asumadu expressed his huge disappointment at the 2019 Ghana DJ Awards, after he felt snubbed by the organizers of the awards despite playing many shows in the clubs and events.

References

External links

Awards established in 2012
Ghanaian music awards
2012 establishments in Ghana